Lakeview Community Schools is a school district headquartered in unincorporated Platte County, Nebraska, near Columbus.

Schools
 Lakeview Junior-Senior High School
 Platte Center School
 Shell Creek School

References

External links
 Lakeview Community Schools
School districts in Nebraska
Education in Platte County, Nebraska